Thliptoceras impube is a moth in the family Crambidae. It was described by Zhang in 2014. It is found in Guangdong, China.

The wingspan is 22–24 mm. The wings are pale yellow, gradually deepening from the postmedial line to the termen. The markings are fuscous.

Etymology
The species name refers to the uncus without setae and is derived from Latin impubis (meaning hairless).

References

Moths described in 2014
Pyraustinae